See Indira Varma for the actress of whose name this is a common misspelling
Indra Varma was an Indian monarch who is considered to be the first ruler of the Vishnukundin dynasty. He might have carved out a small principality for himself probably as a subordinate of the Vakatakas sometime about the last quarter of the fourth century CE. Not much information is known about the next two kings, Madhav Varma I and his son Govinda Varma. They might have kept intact the inheritance or extended their sway to some extent.

See also
History of India
Deccan

References

4th-century Indian monarchs
Varma, Indra
History of Andhra Pradesh